Langendernbach (also: Dernbach) is a small river of Rhineland-Palatinate and Hesse, Germany. It flows into the Elbbach in the village Langendernbach.

See also
List of rivers of Hesse
List of rivers of Rhineland-Palatinate

Rivers of Rhineland-Palatinate
Rivers of Hesse
Rivers of the Westerwald
Rivers of Germany